Laroche-près-Feyt is a commune in the Corrèze department in central France.

Geography
The Chavanon forms the commune's eastern boundary.

Population

Notable people
The following were born in Laroche-près-Feyt:

 Pierre Flote (middle of 13th century - 11 July 1302), possibly born here, Chancellor to Philip IV, le Bel, éventuellement né à Laroche-près-Feyt.
 Pierre de Besse (1567 - 11 November 1639), preacher to Louis XIII.
 Jean-Hippolyte Michon  (1806-1881), priest, archaeologist, inventor of graphology.

See also
Communes of the Corrèze department

References

Communes of Corrèze